Douglas E. Richards (born May 7, 1962) is an American writer, primarily of science fiction and both nonfiction and fiction for children.

Biography
Richards grew up in Cincinnati, Ohio.
He graduated from Finneytown High School, in Ohio, in 1980.  He obtained a B.S. in microbiology from Ohio State University before getting a master's degree in molecular biology from the University of Wisconsin and an MBA from the University of Chicago. He currently lives in San Diego, California, with his wife and two children.

George Noory wrote, "Douglas E. Richards has been widely praised for his ability to weave action, suspense, and science into riveting novels that brilliantly straddle the thriller and science fiction genres."

Publications

Young Adult Fiction
 The Prometheus Project, Book 1: Trapped (2004) Paragon Press. E-book ASIN: B007ET4K7Y; Other:
 The Prometheus Project, Book 2: Captured (2012) Paragon Press. 
 The Prometheus Project, Book 3: Stranded (2012) Paragon Press. 
 The Devil's Sword (2010) Paragon Press. 
 Out of This World (2012) Paragon Press.

Wired Series
 WIRED (Wired 1) (2011)  Paragon Press.  Techno-thriller (#13 on The New York Times Best Seller list for fiction on November 6, 2011. Also, 5 weeks on the USA Today Best Seller list.) 
 AMPED (Wired 2) (2012)  Paragon Press.

Nick Hall Series
 Mind's Eye (Nick Hall 1) (2014) Paragon Press. 
 BrainWeb (Nick Hall 2) (2015) Paragon Press. 
 Mind War (Nick Hall 3) (2016) Paragon Press.

Split Second Series
 Split Second (2015) Paragon Press.  (#17 Amazon Best Seller as of August, 2017.)
 Time Frame (2018) Paragon Press.

Alien Artifact Series
 The Enigma Cube (2020) Paragon Press. 
 A Pivot In Time (2020) Paragon Press.

Other books
 The Cure (2013) Tor/Forge. ASIN: B00CQY7SBW; 
 Quantum Lens (2014) Paragon Press. 
 Game Changer (2016) Paragon Press. 
 Infinity Born (2017) Paragon Press. 
 Seeker (2018) Paragon Press. 
 Veracity (2019) Paragon Press. 
 Oracle  (2019)  Paragon Press. 
 Undentified (2021) Paragon Press.

Private Imprint
 Paragon Press is Douglas E. Richard's private imprint. Many items from Paragon Press are also available in paper editions from CreateSpace, and audible editions from Audible.com.

References

External links
Official website

1962 births
Living people
American science fiction writers
American male novelists